Qazi Jahan Rural District is in Howmeh District of Azarshahr County, East Azerbaijan province, Iran. At the census of 2006, its population was 5,853 in 1,576 households; there were 6,183 inhabitants in 1,918 households at the following census of 2011; and in the most recent census of 2016, the population of the rural district was 6,083 in 1,978 households. The largest of its four villages was Qazi Jahan, with 3,359 people.

References 

Azarshahr County

Rural Districts of East Azerbaijan Province

Populated places in East Azerbaijan Province

Populated places in Azarshahr County